The 912th Aircraft Control and Warning Squadron is an inactive United States Air Force unit. It was last assigned to the Sault Sainte Marie Air Defense Sector, Air Defense Command, stationed at Ramore Air Station, Ontario, Canada. It was inactivated on 1 January 1962.

The unit was a General Surveillance Radar squadron providing for the air defense of North America.

Lineage
 Established as the 912th Aircraft Control and Warning Squadron
 Activated on 10 March 1952
 Discontinued 1 January 1962

Assignments
 32d Air Division, 10 March 1952
 30th Air Division, 21 December 1952
 4708th Defense Wing, 16 February 1953
 30th Air Division, 8 July 1956
 Sault Sainte Marie Air Defense Sector, 1 April 1960 - 1 January 1962

Stations
 Grenier Air Force Base, New Hampshire, 10 March 1952
 Ramore Air Station, Ontario, 21 December 1952 - 1 January 1962

References

 Cornett, Lloyd H. and Johnson, Mildred W., A Handbook of Aerospace Defense Organization  1946 - 1980,  Office of History, Aerospace Defense Center, Peterson AFB, CO (1980).

External links

Radar squadrons of the United States Air Force
Aerospace Defense Command units